The Women's 100 metre freestyle event at the 2010 Commonwealth Games took place on 5 and 6 October 2010, at the SPM Swimming Pool Complex.

Six heats were held, with most containing the maximum number of swimmers (eight). The heat in which a swimmer competed did not formally matter for advancement, as the swimmers with the top sixteen times advanced to the semifinals and the top eight times from the semi-finals qualified for the finals.

Heats
The Heats started on 9:00 local time.

Heat 1

Heat 2

Heat 3

Heat 4

Heat 5

Heat 6

Semifinals

Semifinal 1

Semifinal 2

Final

See also 
2010 Commonwealth Games
Swimming at the 2010 Commonwealth Games

References

Aquatics at the 2010 Commonwealth Games
2010 in women's swimming